Joel Robert Beeke (born in Kalamazoo, Michigan, December 9, 1952) is an American Reformed pastor and theologian. He is a minister of the Heritage Reformed Congregation in Grand Rapids, Michigan, and President of Puritan Reformed Theological Seminary, where he is also the professor of Systematic Theology and Homiletics. He is an expert on the Puritans.

Beeke studied at Western Michigan University, Thomas Edison College, the Netherlands Reformed Theological School and Westminster Theological Seminary.

In 2018, a Festschrift was published in his honor. Puritan Piety: Writings in Honor of Joel R. Beeke included contributions from Sinclair B. Ferguson, W. Robert Godfrey, Richard Muller, Leland Ryken, and Chad Van Dixhoorn.

Published works

Interview
{Stories to tell - Joel Beeke - Sunday 16 January 2022}

Blog
{Joel Beeke Blog}

Books

(update section as necessary)

References

1952 births
Living people
20th-century Calvinist and Reformed theologians
21st-century Calvinist and Reformed theologians
American Calvinist and Reformed theologians
Presidents of Calvinist and Reformed seminaries
Western Michigan University alumni
Westminster Theological Seminary alumni